Extra Curricular are a future soul band from Huddersfield, England.  Their members are Thabo Mkwananzi (born 3 August 1981), Jack Button (born 9 February 1987), Noah Burton (born 7 November 1986), Greg Nicholas (born 13 March 1989), John Waugh (born 1 October 1989) and Martin Chung (born 10 April 1981).  They have played alongside Example, Labrinth, Professor Green, Tinchy Stryder, Zane Lowe, Tower of Power, DJ Yoda, The Furious 5 and Craig Charles. Their musical style combines elements of hip hop, rock and electronic music.

They formed in 2009 from a series of after-hours jam sessions in Huddersfield.  In 2011, they were offered the chance to record music at Leeds University, where they recorded their first EP titled "EC". In 2012, they released two EPs on Doorly's label Pigeonhole This! The band's EP "Won't Stay Down' reached number 11 in the I-tunes electronic music chart.  The follow up EP "Last Day" received support from Radio 1's Annie Mac, Toddla T, Friction and Mixmag.

Discography 
 "EC"
 "Won't Stay Down" 
 "Last Day"

References

British contemporary R&B musical groups